Sam Hewitt (born 29 April 1999) is a professional rugby league footballer who plays as a  forward for Wakefield Trinity, on short-term loan from the Huddersfield Giants in the Super League.

Playing career

Huddersfield Giants
In 2018 he made his Super League début for Huddersfield against Leeds.

Hewitt s a graduate of Huddersfield's Academy system.

Workington Town (loan)
He has spent time on loan from Huddersfield at Workington Town in Betfred League 1.

Halifax Panthers (2021 loan)
On 14 Feb 2021, it was reported that he had signed a season-long loan deal for Halifax in the RFL Championship

References

External links
Huddersfield Giants profile
SL profile

1999 births
Living people
English rugby league players
Halifax R.L.F.C. players
Huddersfield Giants players
Rugby league centres
Rugby league players from Yorkshire
Rugby league second-rows
Wakefield Trinity players
Workington Town players